The High Peak Trail is a  trail for walkers, cyclists and horse riders in the Peak District of England. Running from Dowlow , near Buxton, to High Peak Junction, Cromford , it follows the trackbed of the former Cromford and High Peak Railway, which was completed in 1831 to carry minerals and goods between the Cromford Canal wharf at High Peak Junction and the Peak Forest Canal at Whaley Bridge.

Closure of the line occurred during the Beeching era, with the first section of the line closing in 1963 (i.e. the Middleton Incline) followed by full closure in 1967.

In 1971 the Peak Park Planning Board and Derbyshire County Council bought the largest part of the trackbed and, in partnership with the Countryside Commission, adapted it for its current leisure use. The trail has a crushed limestone surface which makes it ideal for all users, including wheelchair use, assisted by level access onto the trail at various points along its route.

The High Peak Trail is now a national route of the National Cycle Network.

The elevated nature of the trail (the highest part of the line is at Ladmanlow, at a height of ) affords many splendid views across the countryside. However, these higher sections can also be very exposed in poor weather. The original railway incorporated a number of inclines at its northern and southern ends, and whilst much of the trail is fairly level, these sections are naturally steeper.

The High Peak Trail crosses the Limestone Way near Harboro' Rocks.

The High Peak Trail (and part of the Tissington Trail) are also designated part of the Pennine Bridleway, a  leisure route which starts at Middleton Top, near Cromford, and includes  through Derbyshire to the South Pennines. The Trail also forms part of the Midshires Way, a long-distance footpath and bridleway which runs for  through the Midlands from Bledlow to Stockport.

The High Peak Trail forms part of the White Peak Loop Trail, a  route for walking, cycling and horse riding in the Peak District. It links the High Peak Trail with the Monsal Trail, with linking sections through the towns of Buxton, Bakewell and Matlock. The White Peak Loop is being developed by Derbyshire County Council and  some sections are not yet complete.

Access and facilities on the trail
 At Hurdlow (map ref. ), at the northern end of the trail, there is parking and level access onto the trail. Picnic tables are provided.
 At Parsley Hay (map ref. ), where the trail is joined by the Tissington Trail, there is direct access from the car park to the trail. Facilities include toilets, a picnic site, visitor information, and cycle hire.
 At Friden (map ref. ) there is a car park giving level access onto the trail. There is a picnic table.
 At Minninglow (map ref. ) there is a car park and picnic site, with level access onto the trail.
 At Middleton Top there is a visitor centre, with car park and toilets. Cycles can also be hired here.
 At Black Rocks there is a car park, toilets, and shop for light refreshments.
 At High Peak Junction there is a Visitor Centre and shop. Light refreshments can be purchased and there are picnic tables outside. Lea Road car park, over the river, is accessible by footbridge.
 Nearby is the National Stone Centre, Wirksworth.

See also

 Cromford and High Peak Railway
 Tissington Trail

References

External links

High Peak Trail - access and facilities
High Peak railway & Trail site
More on the High Peak Trail
A description of the route, with history and photos
The Pennine Bridleway

Peak District
Rail trails in England
Footpaths in Derbyshire
Tourist attractions of the Peak District